Toma Junior Popov (born 29 September 1998) is a French badminton player. He won the bronze medal at the 2015 European Junior Championships in the boys' singles event. Popov made history as the first non-Danish male player to win a European Junior team gold as well as the men's singles and doubles in 2017. He joined Peter Gade, Jim Laugesen, and Thomas Stuer-Lauridsen as the only men to have ever completed the treble. He competed at the 2018 Mediterranean Games and claimed the men's singles bronze medal.

Personal life 
Born in Sofia, Popov came from a badminton family. His father, Thomas, is a former Bulgarian and French national player. His brother, Christo Popov, also plays badminton. Both of them trained at the Fos-sur-Mer club.

Achievements

European Championships 
Men's singles

Mediterranean Games 
Men's singles

European Junior Championships 
Boys' singles

Boys' doubles

BWF World Tour (4 titles)
The BWF World Tour, which was announced on 19 March 2017 and implemented in 2018, is a series of elite badminton tournaments sanctioned by the Badminton World Federation (BWF). The BWF World Tour is divided into levels of World Tour Finals, Super 1000, Super 750, Super 500, Super 300 (part of the BWF World Tour), and the BWF Tour Super 100.

Men's singles

BWF International Challenge/Series (10 titles, 1 runner-up)
Men's singles

Men's doubles

BWF Junior International (9 titles, 4 runners-up)
Boys' singles

Boys' doubles

  BWF Junior International Grand Prix tournament
  BWF Junior International Challenge tournament
  BWF Junior International Series tournament
  BWF Junior Future Series tournament

References

External links 
 
 

1998 births
Living people
Sportspeople from Sofia
French male badminton players
Competitors at the 2018 Mediterranean Games
Mediterranean Games bronze medalists for France
Mediterranean Games medalists in badminton